Free Press is a United States advocacy group that is part of the media reform or media democracy movement. Their mission includes, "saving Net Neutrality, achieving affordable internet access for all, uplifting the voices of people of color in the media, challenging old and new media gatekeepers to serve the public interest, ending unwarranted surveillance, defending press freedom and reimagining local journalism." The group is a major supporter of net neutrality.

History, organization, and activities
Free Press is a 501(c)(3) organization. Free Press Action Fund is a 501(c)(4) organization and is the group's advocacy arm.

Free Press was co-founded in 2003 by media scholar Robert W. McChesney, progressive journalist John Nichols, and activist Josh Silver.

It is part of the broader "media reform movement" (or "media democracy movement"), and has described its work in these terms. This movement promotes ideas of "media localism" and opposes media consolidation. Like other organizations that are part of the same movement (such as the Consumer Federation of America, Consumers Union and the Center for Digital Democracy), Free Press is concerned with issues such as Federal Communications Commission regulations, "as well as Congressional funding for public broadcasting and the malfeasance of corporate media."

Free Press leads the Save the Internet coalition, which advocates for net neutrality. The coalition consists of individuals, nonprofits, and companies, ranging from advocacy groups to consumer groups to Silicon Valley companies, including Google and Microsoft.

Free Press organized six National Conferences for Media Reform (NCMRs) from 2003 to 2013. It currently hosts workshops, community forums, protests and other events around the country.

Free Press is headquartered in Washington, D.C. It has a staff of 31 people in 2020.

Net neutrality
Free Press is a strong supporter of net neutrality. In 2008, Free Press was the key mover in a pro-net neutrality campaign that "drew together strange bedfellows, including the Christian Coalition, the American Civil Liberties Union and the Gun Owners of America, and helped set in motion a broader debate on the issue" that resulted in an FCC hearing on the subject. In its campaign for net neutrality, Free Press has been allied with Democratic members of Congress. The group supports the 2015 Open Internet Order, in which the FCC classified broadband internet as a common carrier service under Title II of the Communications Act of 1934,  which meant that "no content could be blocked by broadband providers and that the internet would not be divided into pay-to-play fast lanes for internet and media companies that can afford it and slow lanes for everyone else."

Free Press has long been strongly critical of FCC Chairman Ajit Pai because of Pai's opposition to net neutrality regulations. In 2017, Free Press's president Craig Aaron has said that the reversal of the 2015 Open Internet Order "would put consumers at the mercy of phone and cable companies." Pai, in turn, has been critical of Free Press, asserting that Free Press has a "socialist" agenda.

Leadership
The board of directors includes Craig Aaron, Michael Copps, Ashley Allison, Alvaro Bedoya, Olga Davidson, Joan Donovan, Martha Fuentes-Bautista, Bryan Mercer, Victor Pickard and Ben Scott.

See also 
 Media activism

References

External links

2003 establishments in the United States
Freedom of the press
Internet-related activism
Northampton, Massachusetts
Organizations based in Massachusetts
Organizations established in 2003